Lomir may refer to:
 Isradipine, a pharmaceutical of the calcium channel blocker class
 Lombar, a village in Iran